Brendan Francis "Brush" Shiels (born 24 October 1945, Phibsboro, Dublin, Ireland) is an Irish musician from County Dublin, best known for being the frontman of Gary Moore's first band, Skid Row. Brush Shiels had a TV show on RTÉ called Off yer Brush and was twice managed by boyband mentor Louis Walsh. He now appears regularly providing musical accompaniment on the Joe Duffy Liveline radio programme on RTÉ and still performs live around venues in the UK and Ireland.

Brush also enjoyed a brief spell as a footballer representing Bohemian F.C. in the 1960s. Shiels has helped Bohemians recent times by making appearances at fundraising events to try and ensure the survival of his former club.

In 1971 Billboard praised Shiels, Bridgeman and Moore for their album 34 Hours suggesting the "lads will travel far". Shiels played at such internationally known music venues such as Fillmore West and Whisky a Go Go. and in 1986 played at the Self Aid benefit concert for unemployed in Ireland.

In December 2012 he suffered a heart failure caused by a viral infection and was admitted to Connolly Hospital in Blanchardstown for two weeks. In 2013, Brush was one of the legends from the Irish entertainment business to perform at the Philip Chevron testimonial.

Discography

With Skid Row
Skid Row (CBS, 1970)
Skid (CBS, 1970)
34 Hours (CBS, 1971)
Alive and Kicking (Release Records, 1976) 
Skid Row (a.k.a. Gary Moore/Brush Shiels/Noel Bridgeman) (Castle Classics, 1990)
Live And On Song (Hux, 2006) 
Bon Jovi Never Rang Me (Bruised Records, 2012)

Solo
Brush Shiels (Hawk, 1977)
Old Pal (CMR, 1986)
Fields of Athenry (Bruised Records, 1988)
Bad Bob's Country Boogie (as "Brush Shiels & The Dublin Outlaws") (Bruised Records, 1990)
Wrapped Silage (Tractor, 1994)
Celtic Road Warrior (BUS Records, 1997)
18 Celtic Rock Classics (BUS Records, 1999)
Mad Dog Woman originally titled Skid Row Revisited (Brush Music, 2009)
A Brush With Life (Bruised Records, 2012)

References

External links
Unofficial Site
[ AMG page on Brush Shiels]
Brush Shiels in Concert

Musicians from County Dublin
Irish male singers
Living people
1945 births